La Corrada is one of five parishes (administrative divisions) in Soto del Barco, a municipality within the province and autonomous community of Asturias, in northern Spain.  

The postal code is 33458.

Villages
 Arenas
 Los Calbuetos
 La Carcabina
 Carcedo
 La Corrada
 La Ferrería
 Folgueras
 Ponte
 Ríocuevas
 Sombredo
 La Tejera

Parishes in Soto del Barco